Simon Young may refer to:

 Simon Young (magistrate) (1823–1893), magistrate of the Pitcairn Islands
 Simon Young (presenter), Irish radio and television presenter
 Simon Young (mayor), 7th mayor of Pitcairn Islands